Pierre-Roland Giot (September 23, 1919 – January 4, 2002) was a French anthropologist, archaeologist and geologist.

Notes and references

1919 births
2002 deaths
French anthropologists
20th-century French archaeologists
20th-century French geologists
20th-century anthropologists
Corresponding Fellows of the British Academy